The 2021 Stadium Super Trucks Series was the ninth season of the Stadium Super Trucks. The season began with the Grand Prix of St. Petersburg on April 24–25 and ended at the Grand Prix of Long Beach on September 24–26.

Matthew Brabham finished on the podium in each of the ten races and won twice to claim his third consecutive championship. This broke a three-way tie with Robby Gordon and Sheldon Creed for the most titles, and the former finished second in points.

Drivers

Schedule
The Grand Prix of Long Beach, which had hosted the trucks since the inaugural season in 2013 but was canceled in 2020 due to the COVID-19 pandemic, returned for 2021. As a precaution with the pandemic ongoing, the race was moved from its traditional April slot to September. The Firestone Grand Prix of St. Petersburg, also an IndyCar Series street circuit, returned to the SST schedule for the first time since 2017. June and July weekends at Mid-Ohio Sports Car Course with the NASCAR Xfinity Series and IndyCar, respectively, both of which last took place in 2019, were also added to the slate. The series also joined IndyCar at the inaugural Music City Grand Prix in Nashville.

On March 18, SST announced it had partnered with the newly formed Great American Shortcourse (GAS) series to hold a season finale together in Southern California in November. However, GAS ultimately conducted its own weekend at Glen Helen Raceway without SST involvement while series head Robby Gordon was at the Baja 1000.

Season summary
In addition to series regulars Gordon, Matthew Brabham, and Bill Hynes, the season opener at St. Petersburg marked the returns of Jett Noland and Gordon's 12-year-old son Max, both of whom debuted in 2020; Arie Luyendyk Jr., who won in the trucks' most recent race weekend; and reigning NASCAR Camping World Truck Series champion Sheldon Creed, the winningest driver in SST history. Robert Stout, a sports car racer and the 2019 Lucas Oil Off Road Racing Series Production 1000 UTV champion, made his SST debut in the first race of a full-time season, while former NASCAR Truck Series driver Bo LeMastus was a late entrant. Creed held off Brabham to win both races.

Preceding the first Mid-Ohio weekend, Xfinity Series driver Justin Allgaier participated in practice and qualifying; he was sixth of eight drivers. Creed won the first race but retired from the second with a transmission failure that enabled Gordon to win. Other drivers in the field included Aaron Bambach, who was running his first race since 2018, and NASCAR Cup Series veteran Greg Biffle. The second weekend at Mid-Ohio saw Hynes return after skipping the first due to scheduling conflicts; Noland and LeMastus also made their returns along with Jerett Brooks, who last made an SST start at the 2019 Race of Champions. Brabham swept the weekend. The end of the first race saw a fight between Hynes and LeMastus regarding LeMastus' aggressive driving against Max Gordon, with LeMastus removing his helmet and throwing his steering wheel at Hynes before the latter spiked the former's helmet.

The Music City Grand Prix weekend saw the returns of Ricky Johnson and Jeff Ward, both of whom last raced in 2013, and the debuts of NASCAR's Stanton Barrett and the Indy Pro 2000 Championship's Jacob Abel. Crosley Brands assumed naming rights for the weekend, which dubbed the series the Crosley Stadium Super Trucks, and sponsored the trucks of LeMastus, Johnson, Ward, Luyendyk, and Abel; Ricky Howerton was initially scheduled to drive before being replaced by Abel. Gordon won the first race while Stout scored his maiden series victory in the second ahead of Abel.

Newcomers at Long Beach included rally raid driver Christian Sourapas, former motorcycle racer Brandon Parrish, and GT4 America Series competitor Mads Siljehaug. Zoey Edenholm, who made her SST debut in 2020, returned to the series. Operating on a "pretty smart" strategy of conserving his brakes, Brooks won the first race after starting at the back. Gordon won the second race to score his fourth victory at Long Beach and break a tie with Brabham for the most at the street circuit.

Results and standings

Race results

Drivers' championship

Notes

References

Stadium